Thompsonulidae is a family of copepods belonging to the order Harpacticoida.

Genera:
 Caribbula Huys & Gee, 1990
 Thompsonula Scott, 1905

References

Copepods